The California Collegiate League (CCL), founded in 1993, is a collegiate summer baseball league headquartered in Moorpark, California, United States.  It is associated with both the National Baseball Congress and National Alliance of College Summer Baseball.

The CCL hosts a 40-game summer season including a north-vs.-south All-Star Game, televised nationally by Bally's Sports West. Players use wooden bats and professional-level baseballs to further their development as potential professional ballplayers.

History 
The League was formed in 1993 and seen several changes through the years.  The only two original members who still exist are the Santa Barbara Foresters and San Luis Obispo Blues.  The league is considered one of top 10 collegiate summer leagues in the country.  The league is known for the location of its teams and for holding a nationally televised all star game every July.

Timeline of recent events:
Four new teams from Northern California joined the CCL in 2014 (Menlo Park Legends, Neptune Beach Pearl, Pacific Union Capitalists and Walnut Creek Crawdads).

Since 2014, the CCL has undergone significant growth and expansion, now chartering teams from Placerville to Orange County.  Teams added to the league since the conclusion of 2013 postseason include, the Walnut Creek Crawdads, the Neptune Beach Pearl, the Menlo Park Legends (who have since left the league), and the Orange Country Riptide.

In 2015, the Texas Rangers, selected Dillon Tate with the fourth overall pick in the 2015 MLB Draft, marking the highest a CCL alumnus has been drafted.

In 2017, the California Collegiate League will expand to include the Rockville Rock Hounds, the Auburn Wildcats, the Long Beach Legends, and the Arroyo Seco Saints.  This will bring the total number of teams from 10 to 14.

2020 League makes major changes:
The California Collegiate League’s 2020 season will have a new look in the upcoming summer as the league will now consist of a three division format: South, Central, and North Divisions.
Four teams will make up the new Northern Division, with the Healdsburg Prune Packers, Lincoln Potters and the Solano Mudcats making the transition from being members of the former Affiliate Division, into becoming full-members of the California Collegiate League in 2020. They will be joined by the fourth team of the new conference, the Walnut Creek Crawdads. The Central Division will have the San Luis Obispo Blues, Santa Barbara Foresters and Conejo Oaks.  The Southern Division will have Arroyo Seco Saints, Academy Barons and Orange County Riptide.

Current teams

Former teams 
 Ventura Halos
 Long Beach Legends
 Southern California Catch
 Rockville Rockhounds
 Neptune Beach Pearl
 Bakersfield Sound
 Glendale Angelenos
 Los Angeles Brewers
 Monterey Bay Sox
 Menlo Park Legends
 Novato Knicks
 PUF Capitalists
 Team Vegas
 Santa Maria Indians

Champions

Statistical leaders history

Batting

Pitching

Notable alumni of current teams
While all teams in the California Collegiate League have combined for over 100 years of history, not all teams have played in the CCL throughout their history.  The notable alumni of the current teams who have played in the CCL or in their respective teams' previous leagues include:

Academy Barons 
 Khris Davis
 Dillon Tate

Arroyo Seco Saints 
 John Holdzkom
 Christian Bergman

Conejo Oaks 
 Ryon Healy
 Tyler Heineman

Neptune Beach Pearl 
 Lucas Erceg

Santa Barbara Foresters

 Dylan Axelrod
 Morgan Ensberg
 Kevin Frandsen
 Ryan Church
 Cameron Rupp
 James Shields
 Ryan Spilborghs
 Sean Tracey
 Virgil Vasquez
 Tyler Walker
 Delwyn Young

San Luis Obispo Blues 
 Doug Bernier
 Casey Candaele
 C. J. Cron
 Chuck Estrada
 Casey Fien
 Brian Fuentes
 Matt Garza
 Marcus Gwyn
 Kyle Hendricks
 Roy Howell
 Jim Lonborg
 Adam Moore
 Brent Morel
 Will Ohman
 Ross Stripling
 Mel Queen

Healdsburg Prune Packers 
 Andrew Vaughn
 Jake Scheiner

Orange County Riptide 
 Dominic Fletcher

Notable alumni of past teams
Alon Leichman

References

External links
 California Collegiate League

Summer baseball leagues
College baseball leagues in the United States
Baseball leagues in California
1993 establishments in California
Sports leagues established in 1993